Xuanhanosaurus (meaning "Xuanhan lizard") is a genus of theropod dinosaur that lived during the Middle Jurassic of China, around 167.7 to 161.2 million years ago.

Discovery 

The type species Xuanhanosaurus qilixiaensis was named by Dong Zhiming in 1984. The generic name refers to Xuanhan County in Sichuan, while the specific name is derived from the town of Qilixia. The holotype specimen, IVPP V.6729, was found in China's Lower Shaximiao Formation. It consists of a partial skeleton without a skull.

Description 

Xuanhanosaurus was approximately 4.5 meters (15 ft) in length, with a weight of 250 kilograms (550 lb). Xuanhanosaurus had powerful forelimbs, over 65 cm long; this, along with the retention of the fourth metacarpal in the hand, led Dong to suggest that Xuanhanosaurus might have walked on all four legs. If so, it would be the only known four-legged meat-eater among dinosaurs. Later paleontologists have not agreed with Dong's original assessment. They think this dinosaur walked on its hind legs as other theropods did, pronation of the lower arm being impossible. The strong arms could instead have been useful in catching prey.

Phylogeny 
Assigned by Dong to the Megalosauridae, Xuanhanosaurus was found by Roger Benson in 2009 to belong to a primitive lineage of the Megalosauroidea. A more recent study by Benson and colleagues in 2010 found that it was more likely to be the most primitive known member of the Metriacanthosauridae family. In 2019, Rauhut and Pol recovered Xuanhanosaurus outside of Metriacanthosauridae, as the basalmost member of Allosauroidea.

References

Metriacanthosaurids
Middle Jurassic dinosaurs of Asia
Jurassic China
Taxa named by Dong Zhiming
Fossil taxa described in 1984
Paleontology in Sichuan